Fuck for Forest is a 2012 documentary film directed by Michal Marczak. The film premiered in Poland on 13 October 2012 at the Warsaw Film Festival, where it won Best Documentary. It premiered in the United States at the South by Southwest Film Festival on 8 March 2013. In 2013 it was nominated for the Sheffield Green Award as part of Sheffield Doc/Fest, and received a Special Mention.

Plot
The documentary follows Fuck for Forest, or FFF, a non-profit environmental organization founded in 2004 in Norway by Leona Johansson and Tommy Hol Ellingsen, which raises money for rescuing the world's rainforests by producing pornographic material or having sex in public.

Reception

Critical reception
On review aggregator website Rotten Tomatoes, the film has an approval rating of 54% based on 13 reviews, with an average rating of 6.1/10.

Controversy
In March 2013, Michal Marczak was criticized on the FFF website for manipulating events, such as setting up the "NGO meeting" in Brazil by feeding false information to the FFF team.

References

External links 

Fuck for Forest at culture.pl

2012 films
Documentary films about forests and trees
Documentary films about pornography
2010s English-language films
Films shot in Brazil
Films shot in Colombia
Films shot in Germany
Films set in Berlin
Films shot in Norway
Films shot in Peru
2010s German-language films
2010s Norwegian-language films
Nudity and protest
2010s Spanish-language films
2012 documentary films
2012 multilingual films